The Piedmont (also known as the Piedmont Service) is a regional passenger train operated by Amtrak and the North Carolina Department of Transportation (NCDOT), running three round-trips daily between Raleigh and Charlotte, North Carolina. It is a sister train to the Carolinian, which runs from Charlotte to New York City. The Piedmont route is coextensive with the far southern leg of the Carolinian, largely paralleling Interstate 85. Operations began in May 1995.

NCDOT owns the rolling stock used on the Piedmont, unlike the Carolinian, which uses Amtrak rolling stock. Both trains are marketed by NCDOT under the NC By Train brand.

History 
North Carolina developed the Piedmont as a regional follow-on to the Carolinian, which had entered service in early 1990. With the growing popularity of the Carolinian, state officials sought to add a second daily round-trip between Charlotte and Raleigh. However, Amtrak initially balked, claiming that it didn't have enough rolling stock to spare. Undaunted, in the fall of 1990, NCDOT approved the acquisition of five used passenger cars and the leasing of two diesel locomotives. The board planned to have the second train enter service by early 1992.

The Piedmont (as the train came to be called) faced numerous delays. Norfolk Southern, which leased the track, insisted that the state construct a wye in Charlotte for turning the two trains around. In 1993, the cost of the wye plus land purchase was estimated at $200,000; by late 1994, this grew to $695,000, plus $1.5 million for a maintenance facility in Raleigh. The Piedmont finally began operating on May 26, 1995. Originally, it operated with an early-morning trip to Charlotte and a nighttime return to Raleigh. Its creation enabled same-day business travel between Charlotte and Raleigh in both directions.

After delays in refurbishing the motive power and passenger cars, an additional Piedmont round trip began operating on June 5, 2010. With the addition of the second train, Amtrak rebranded the route Piedmont Service to reflect the multiple daily frequencies. 

On March 22, 2011, it was announced that an agreement between NCDOT, Amtrak, Norfolk Southern and the North Carolina Railroad had been reached that would allow for $461 million in grants from the federal government to be used in upgrading infrastructure. The money would be used to add additional double track and passing sidings, as well as reducing curves, resulting in a 13-minute reduction in travel time.

Improvements include the new Raleigh Union Station, which had its "ribbon cutting" in late April 2018 and began accepting trains that July. A third daily Piedmont round trip was added on June 4, 2018. A fourth round trip was planned for 2023, but , Amtrak estimates a 2024 start date.

On April 6, 2020; the Piedmont was truncated to a single round trip due to the COVID-19 pandemic. On May 18, 2020, the Piedmont was suspended in a further round of COVID-related service cutbacks. This left the Carolinian, which returned that day after a month-long suspension, as the only rail link between Charlotte and Raleigh. The Piedmont returned on August 10, with a single round trip. A second round trip was restored in December. On April 5, 2021, the Piedmont resumed its full schedule of three round trips. This was part of a planned larger restoration of service across the Amtrak system in the spring and summer of 2021.

While the Piedmont is operated by Amtrak crews, most other operations are handled by NCDOT. The state sets schedules, owns the equipment, and handles most of the marketing. Maintenance is handled by state contractors at facilities in Charlotte and Raleigh.

On May 27, 2021, Amtrak released a long-range planning document for improved service in the Southeast Region that proposed additional Piedmont frequencies between Charlotte and Raleigh, as well as a potential expansion of two round trips south to Atlanta, Georgia along the route of the Crescent. If implemented, an additional round trip along this corridor would operate only between Charlotte and Atlanta.

On March 9, 2023, NC By Train confirmed on Twitter that a fourth daily round trip of the Piedmont service was slated to begin at some point during summer 2023.

Route details

The Piedmont operates over North Carolina Railroad trackage. Norfolk Southern Railway and its predecessors have leased the NCRR from the state since 1871. 
Charlotte District, Charlotte to Linwood
Danville District, Linwood to Greensboro
Raleigh District, Greensboro to Raleigh

PART operates Amtrak Thruway service between High Point station and Winston-Salem, branded as NC Amtrak Connector. 

The NCDOT offers free transit passes which allow detraining Piedmont passengers to get one free bus ride and one transfer on the same day of travel. Passes are honored by 13 participating transit systems along its route.

Rolling stock

The motive power for the Piedmont has been provided by eight state-owned locomotives. Two are EMD F59PHIs, numbered 1755 (City of Salisbury) and 1797 (City of Asheville). Six are EMD F59PHs, numbered 1810 (City of Greensboro), 1859 (City of High Point), 1869 (City of Durham), 1871 (Town of Cary), 1893 (City of Burlington), and 1984 (City of Kannapolis). NCDOT also has five cab control units which are numbered 101-105. NCDOT's current F59PHs were originally used by GO Transit of Toronto, Ontario, Canada and rebuilt by American Motive Power and Altoona Works.

NCDOT formerly operated two GP40PH-2's rebuilt by AMF. 1768 (City of Charlotte), originally B&O GP40 4008, was sold to the Virginia Railway Express and became VRE V24. 1792 (City of Raleigh), originally L&N GP40 3006, was wrecked in the Mebane accident. Everything except the EMD 645 engine, bell and horn were scrapped.

Since at least 2017, the Piedmont has operated with two locomotives, one on each end of the train, to improve on-time performance. With the addition of more cab control units, the Piedmont will eventually operate in push-pull mode with a single locomotive.

State-owned passenger cars on the Piedmont are refurbished coach cars originally built by Pullman-Standard and the St. Louis Car Company in the 1960s for the Kansas City Southern and Union Pacific. There are five lounge/baggage cars and one coach/baggage car originally built by the St. Louis Car Company in the 1950s and used by the United States Army. The lounge car includes vending machines and complimentary coffee and tea. There are 14 regular coaches used on trains in addition to the six lounge/baggage cars. Each coach is named after a state landmark or state symbol. During the COVID-related service cutbacks of 2020, NCDOT opted to run the Carolinian rather than the Piedmont to save the expense of maintaining the state-owned consists, since the Carolinian uses Amtrak rolling stock.

All rolling stock has been painted in a blue and silver livery, with red accents, based on the North Carolina state flag. The Carolinian uses Amtrak's national red-white-blue livery.

In August 2019, the Federal Railroad Administration awarded NCDOT up to $76.9 million to purchase 13 new coaches, allowing the replacement of some older cars and an expansion to four daily round trips.  On May 22, 2020, Senator Thom Tillis announced that NCDOT will receive an $80 million dollar grant to order 13 additional new railcars (for an overall total of 26 new railcars) and 6 new locomotives to replace the remainder of the current fleet.

By February 2020, nine former circus train cars purchased by NCDOT for $383,000 in 2017 for restoration and use on the Piedmont were stored in Spring Hope, North Carolina. The state listed the nine cars for sale in December 2020. The cars were not sold; they were damaged by fire on March 10, 2022. The five surviving cars were again listed for sale in April 2022.

Stations

References

Notes

External links

NCDOT Rail Division

Railway services introduced in 1995
Amtrak routes
Passenger rail transportation in North Carolina